Leslie Stevens (7 March 1951 – 25 April 2020) was a boxer who competed for England.

Boxing career
Stevens won the Amateur Boxing Association 1971 heavyweight title, when boxing out of the Reading Boxing Club.

He represented England in the -91 kg heavyweight division, at the 1970 British Commonwealth Games in Edinburgh, Scotland.

He turned professional on 13 September 1971 and fought in 27 fights until 1979.

References

1951 births
2020 deaths
English male boxers
Boxers at the 1970 British Commonwealth Games
Commonwealth Games medallists in boxing
Commonwealth Games bronze medallists for England
Heavyweight boxers
Medallists at the 1970 British Commonwealth Games